FC Jeunesse Canach (English:FC Youth Canach) is a football club in Canach, Luxembourg. It was founded in 1930. They play in the National Division, after being promoted from the Division of Honour in 2009–10.

History
Founded in 1930 as FC Fortuna Canach, the club was dissolved at the beginning of the Second World War. The club was reformed in 1946 and then dissolved again in 1953. In 1957, the club was revived under its current name.

The club entered the Luxembourg National Division for the first time in its history for the 2010–11 season.

Current staff (2019/20 season)

Manager:  Raphael Duarte
Assistant coach:  Dimitri del Gobo
Director of Football:  Emile Weber

Managers
 Patrick Maurer (July 1, 1998 – June 30, 2013)
 Fernando Gutiérrez (July 1, 2013 – November 8, 2013)
 Patrick Maurer (caretaker) (November 8, 2013 – 30 December 2015)
 Oseías Luiz Ferreira (January 6, 2016 − October 30, 2016)
 Patrick Maurer (October 31, 2016 − )

References

External links
Official club site

Football clubs in Luxembourg
Remich (canton)
Association football clubs established in 1957
1957 establishments in Luxembourg